David Grant Campbell (born December 6, 1952) is a senior United States district judge of the United States District Court for the District of Arizona.

Early life and education
Born in Salt Lake City, Utah, Campbell received a Bachelor of Science degree from the University of Utah in 1976 and a Juris Doctor from the S.J. Quinney College of Law at the University of Utah in 1979.

Career
Campbell served as a law clerk to Judge J. Clifford Wallace, U.S. Court of Appeals for the Ninth Circuit from 1979 to 1980, and to Associate Justice William H. Rehnquist, Supreme Court of the United States for the 1982 Term. He worked in private practice in the interim year, and returned to private practice in 1982, working most notably at Osborn Maledon in Phoenix, Arizona.
Outside of formal legal practice, Campbell served as an adjunct professor of law at the Arizona State University College of Law, and as a visiting professor of law at Brigham Young University Law School, where he was named professor of the year in 1990.

Judicial service
Campbell is a federal judge on the United States District Court for the District of Arizona. Campbell was nominated by President George W. Bush on March 13, 2003, to a new seat created by 116 Stat. 1758. He was confirmed by the United States Senate, by vote of 92-0, on July 8, 2003. He received his commission on July 15, 2003. Judge Campbell was a member of the Advisory Committee on Federal Rules of Civil Procedure from 2005 to 2011, and chaired the committee from 2011 to 2015, while the Advisory Committee approved important changes to discovery-related rules that ultimately became effective in December 2015.
From 2016 to 2020, Judge Campbell chaired the Committee on Rules of Practice and Procedure for the federal courts, which oversees the Civil, Criminal, Appellate, Bankruptcy, and Evidence advisory committees.  Judge Campbell currently serves as chair of the federal courts' Committee on International Judicial Relations.  
He assumed senior status on July 31, 2018.

Judge Campbell has worked with the courts of Botswana, Namibia, South Africa, and other countries on judicial case management.

He is a member of the American Law Institute and a Fellow of the American Bar Foundation.

Personal
Campbell is a member of the Church of Jesus Christ of Latter-day Saints (LDS Church). He served as a LDS missionary in the England Birmingham Mission and has been a bishop in the LDS Church. Campbell and his wife Stacey are parents to 3 daughters and 2 sons.

Sources

See also 
 List of law clerks of the Supreme Court of the United States (Seat 9)

References

1952 births
Living people
Judges of the United States District Court for the District of Arizona
Law clerks of the Supreme Court of the United States
University of Utah alumni
S.J. Quinney College of Law alumni
Brigham Young University faculty
American leaders of the Church of Jesus Christ of Latter-day Saints
United States district court judges appointed by George W. Bush
21st-century American judges
American Mormon missionaries in England
20th-century Mormon missionaries
Latter Day Saints from Utah
Latter Day Saints from Arizona